North East Corridor may refer to:
 The Northeast Corridor in the United States
 The North East Corridor (Spain) in Spain
 The Northeast Corridor Line of New Jersey Transit